is a Japanese singer, actress and a former member of the Japanese idol girl group Nogizaka46. In addition to her work with Nogizaka46, Ikuta has appeared in multiple television and stage productions, including a Japanese production of Les Misérables.

She is affiliated with Ohta Production from 2007 to 2009 and once again since 2022.

Career
Ikuta was born on January 22, 1997, in Düsseldorf, Germany. She began taking piano lessons at the age of four under the influence of her older sister, who had taken them before her. Her family moved to Tokyo when she was five.

She made her entertainment debut as a child actress in 2007, starring in the musical Coco Smile: Asu e no Rock 'n' Roll. She was affiliated with Ohta Production during that time.

In 2011, she auditioned for Nogizaka46 and was selected as one of the thirty-six first generation members. Her audition song was Aiko's "Star". She was chosen as one of the members performing on the group's debut single "Guruguru Curtain", released on February 22, 2012. In September 2012, she was selected for the leading role of Alice in Nogizaka46's stage musical Sixteen Principal.

On April 20, 2014, she announced that she would take a break from Nogizaka46 to prepare for further schooling. She resumed her activities in August as the choreographic center for Nogizaka46's tenth single "Nandome no Aozora ka?" In 2015, Ikuta appeared in the Fuji TV drama Zannen na Otto as a high school girl who dreams of becoming a pianist. She published her first solo photobook, Tenchō, on January 21, 2016. It sold 38,355 copies in its first week, and ranked first on the Oricon weekly photobook sales chart. It also ranked first on the Oricon book ranking photobook category in the first half of the year 2016.

In July 2016, it was announced that Ikuta had been chosen for the role of Cosette in a 30th anniversary production of Les Miserables in Japan, a role she reprised in 2019. In 2021, It was announced that Ikuta would play Éponine in Les Miserables in 2021.

In January 2021, she and fellow Nogizaka46 member Sayuri Matsumura performed a cover of the song "1・2・3" by Mafumafu and Soraru; the song was used as an opening theme to the anime series Pokémon Master Journeys: The Series. On October 25, Ikuta announced she will graduate from Nogizaka46 on December 31, 2021 on her official blog. Her graduation concert took place at the Yokohama Arena on December 14 and 15. She sang and performed on the stage of the 72nd NHK Kouhaku Uta Gassen on December 31, and it was her last activity as a member of Nogizaka46.

On January 5, 2022, five days after her graduation from Nogizaka46, Ikuta announced her return to her talent agency during her days as a child actress, Ohta Production. On January 8, her official Twitter account was opened. On February 1, her official website was opened (with a fan event on 19 to commemorate the occasion), while her Nogizaka46 blog posts were deleted.

Ikuta's first post-Nogizaka46 acting role was as Mio Mukai in the Fuji TV series Gossip: #Kanojo ga Shiritai Honto no 〇〇.

Her second fan event, "Erika Ikuta 2022 summer fun", was held on August 3, 2022 at Zepp DiverCity and August 6 at Zepp Namba.

On November 1, 2022, her first calendar was released. It was available to the members of her official website until December 31.

Her third fan event, "Erika Ikuta 2022 winter fun", was held on December 3, 2022 at Zepp Osaka Bayside and on December 11 at KT Zepp Yokohama.

Discography

Singles with Nogizaka46

Albums with Nogizaka46

Other featured songs

Filmography

Television

Films

Japanese dub

Theater

Concerts
 2017: MTV Unplugged: Erika Ikuta

Bibliography

Photobooks
 Kikan Nogizaka vol.4 Saitō (26 December 2014, Tokyo News Service) 
 Tenchō=Modulation Erika Ikuta 1st Photo Book (21 January 2016, Shueisha) 
Erika Ikuta Nogizaka46 Graduation Memorial Book: Kanon (14 December 2021, Kodansha)

References

External links
 

 

Nogizaka46 members
1997 births
Living people
Japanese idols
21st-century Japanese actresses
21st-century Japanese pianists
Japanese women pop singers
Japanese pianists
Singers from Tokyo